Khawja Ajmeri KG and High School is a private school, established in 1974 by the Khawja Ajmeri Education Society, in Agrabad, a neighbourhood of Chittagong, Bangladesh. There are two four-storied academic buildings; each of them comprises twenty-four classrooms. The school has about 2800 students from class one to ten. It has a staff strength of 50 teachers and 15 clerks. The school follows NCTB format for the education process.

References

High schools in Bangladesh
Schools in Chittagong
Buildings and structures in Agrabad